General James may refer to:

Amaziah B. James (1812–1883), New York State Militia major general
Daniel James Jr. (1920–1978), U.S. Air Force general
Frank B. James (1912–2004), U.S. Air Force brigadier general
Henry James (British Army officer) (1803–1877), British Army lieutenant general
Larry D. James (born 1956), U.S. Air Force lieutenant general
Thomas S. James Jr. (born 1963), U.S. Army lieutenant general
Thomas L. James (fl. 1990s–2020s), U.S. Army brigadier general
William James (general) (1930–2015), Australian Army major general
William C. James (1896–1974), U.S. Marine Corps brigadier general

See also
Attorney General James (disambiguation)